Aphantopus arvensis is a butterfly found in the Palearctic that belongs to the browns family. The species was first described by Charles Oberthur in 1876. It is endemic to western and central China.

Description from Seitz

A. arvensis Oberth. (45g). Similar to the preceding [A. maculosa]; forewing on both sides as a rule with but 2 eye-spots, which are unequal in size. Ocelli of both wings partly pupilled also above. From West China: Mupin, Wa-shan. etc. — The form campana Leech [A. a. campana Leech, 1892], from Ta-tsien-lu is darker above and has much smaller ocelli, On the underside of the hindwing there is a white spot before the costal ocellus and the white distal band which interrupts the chain of ocelli is lighter and more prominent. In May and June.

References

Satyrinae